Route 164 is a minor state highway in southeastern Connecticut, United States, running from Route 2 in Preston through the village of Preston City to Route 138 in Griswold just south of the borough of Jewett City.

Route description
Route 164 begins as Preston Plains Road at an intersection with Route 2 in the southeastern portion of the town of Preston. It runs for about three miles (5 km) through rural Preston until it reaches Preston City, where it has a junction with Route 165. From here, the road becomes known as Jewett City Road, continuing north for  towards the town of Griswold. In Griswold, the road name changes to Preston Road, continuing north for  until the interchange with I-395 (at Exit 22). Route 164 continues for another  beyond the interchange to end at Route 138 just south of the borough of Jewett City.

A section of Route 164 in Preston from the center of Preston City to the Griswold town line is designated a scenic road.

History
The direct route from the village of Preston City to the borough of Jewett City was established as Route 164 in the 1932 state highway renumbering. No major changes in alignment or designation has occurred since.

Junction list

References

External links

164
Transportation in New London County, Connecticut